Club Deportivo Universidad San Martín de Porres, commonly known as USMP, is a Peruvian football club based in the city of Lima. The club was founded in 2004 as a joint stock company, the first in Peru. In just their first season, the club began playing in the Peruvian top-flight, the Torneo Descentralizado, after they bought the promotional place of the 2003 Segunda División winners, Sport Coopsol. The team obtained their first Descentralizado title in 2007, the second in 2008 and their third in 2010.

The name comes from the Universidad de San Martín de Porres, a university in Lima.

History
In the 2004 Apertura, Universidad San Martin's results were poor. They accumulated 10 points and were positioned last on the table. Although the club managed to win 47 points and reached second place in the Clausura. In total, San Martin was placed 12th with 57 points. On the relegation table they placed eleventh, remaining in the first division. The following season, they did better and placed fourth, qualifying for the 2006 Copa Sudamericana. Although they were eliminated in the preliminary round, they won their first international game by defeating Bolognesi in a home game 3–2 but were eliminated because of the away goals rule. In 2006, they placed 6th on the aggregate table and did not qualify for any international tournament.

The beginning of the 2007 season smiled upon the "Santos". They won the Apertura for the first time after defeating Cienciano 2–1 in Cuzco, qualifying for the 2008 Copa Libertadores. Despite not finishing in the top 6 places in the Clausura tournament, thereby not fulfilling the condition to qualify for the national title playoff, the Clausura winners Coronel Bolognesi had not satisfied the condition in the Apertura either, so no playoff was played and San Martín were awarded the national title on the basis of its better aggregate record throughout the season.

In the 2009 Copa Libertadores, San Martin became the first Peruvian team to pass the group stage since 2004, eliminating River Plate of Argentina, Nacional of Paraguay, Nacional of Uruguay, and would lose in the round of 16 to Grêmio of Brazil 1–5 on aggregate.

On 12 December 2010, at Estadio Monumental, Universidad San Martin defeated León de Huánuco in Peru's two-legged final that gave Universidad San Martín the domestic championship.

On 20 February 2012, the club Universidad San Martín, for extra-sporting issues, announced their definitive retirement from the local tournament and professional football.

On 14 March 2012, the club Universidad San Martín returned to the local tournament and professional football.

Kit and badge

Stadium
U. San Martin currently do not own a stadium. Therefore, they play in the different stadiums of Lima. They have used the Estadio Nacional and Estadio Alejandro Villanueva in the past. Today they choose the Estadio Miguel Grau which it shares with Sport Boys and Academia Cantolao. San Martin, however, are known to favor Universitario's stadium, Estadio Monumental "U". The stadium they choose mostly depends on how many people are expected to attend a game.

Honours

National

League
Peruvian Primera División:
Winners (3): 2007, 2008, 2010

Torneo Apertura / Fase 1:
Winners (1): 2007
Runner-up (1): 2021

Torneo Clausura:
Winners (1): 2008
Runner-up (2): 2004, 2005

National cups
Copa Inca:
Runner-up (1): 2014

Friendly International 
Copa Ciudad de Trujillo:
Winners (1): 2010

Under-20 team
Torneo de Promoción y Reserva:
Winners (2): 2013, 2015-III
Runner-up (2): 2010, 2012

Copa Modelo Centenario: 
Runner-up (1): 2016

Statistics and results

League history

CONMEBOL competitions

Current squad

Players

Managers

Current staff

Managerial history

* Only official tournaments. (FIFA, CONMEBOL, FPF)''

References

External links
 Official website

 
Association football clubs established in 2004
Football clubs in Lima
University and college association football clubs